Dying to Tell is a 2018 Spanish documentary film directed and written by, as well as starring, Hernán Zin.

The film was released by Netflix on 17 May 2019.

Premise 
The documentary is journalism on the life of some Spanish war journalists. It initially focuses on Hernán Zin, but later turns its focus on Zin's fellow Spanish war correspondents who have experienced atrocities or the death of colleagues or have been held hostage. It talks about such events as the disappearance of Antonio Pampliega, José Manuel López and Ángel Sastre, the disappearance and death of Julio Fuentes Serrano, the death of Miguel Gil Moreno de Mora, or one of the 2014 Gaza war beach bombing incidents, among other similar tragedies and situations.

Cast 
 Hernán Zin
 Ángel Sastre
 Manu Brabo (photojournalist)
 Roberto Fraile
 Maysun (photojournalist)
 David Beriáin
 Fran Sevilla (RNE)
 Gervasio Sánchez
 José Antonio Guardiola (TVE)
 Eduard Sanjuán (TV3)
 Mónica G. Prieto
 Javier Espinosa (El Mundo)
 Rosa María Calaf
 Rosa Meneses (El Mundo)
 Julio Fuentes Serrano
 Ramón Lobo
 José Luis Márquez (news cameraman)
 Carlos Hernández
 Carmen Sarmiento
 Ricardo Garcia Vilanova (photojournalist)
 Eric Frattini
 Mònica Bernabé
 Miguel Gil Moreno de Mora (APTN producer and news cameraman)
 Patrocinio Macián (mother of Miguel Gil - voice only)
 Santiago Lyon (photojournalist for AP)

Awards 

 Best Documentary, Documentaries of the World Section, 2018 Montreal World Film Festival
 Best Documentary, Doc España Section, 2018 Valladolid International Film Festival (SEMINCI)

References

External links

 
 
 

2018 films
2018 documentary films
Spanish documentary films
2010s Spanish films